The National Seal of Brazil is one of Brazil's national symbols, displayed on several official documents, such as graduation diplomas, consular and diplomatic papers, military conscription forms, etc. Most documents, however, feature the National Coat of Arms instead of the National Seal.

History
The design of the National Seal is also represented on the reverse side of the Great Seal of the Arms of the Federative Republic of Brazil (that bears the image of the country's coat of arms on the obverse side), and is used by the Presidency of the Republic to authenticate solemn documents together with the President's signature, such as instruments of ratification of international treaties.

The wax or printed impression of the National Seal is also used to authenticate the original version of Laws promulgated by the President of Brazil.

The National Seal, together with the nation's flag, anthem and coat of arms, is officially recognised as a national symbol since the Brazilian Republic was formed; its appearance and design is regulated by law.

National symbols of Brazil
National seals